In group theory,  the quaternion group Q8 (sometimes just denoted by Q) is a non-abelian group of order eight, isomorphic to the eight-element subset
 of the quaternions under multiplication. It is given by the group presentation

where e is the identity element and  commutes with the other elements of the group.

Another presentation of Q8 is

Compared to dihedral group 

The quaternion group Q8 has the same order as the dihedral group D4, but a different structure, as shown by their Cayley and cycle graphs:

In the diagrams for D4, the group elements are marked with their action on a letter F in the defining representation R2. The same cannot be done for Q8, since it has no faithful representation in R2 or R3. D4 can be realized as a subset of the split-quaternions in the same way that Q8 can be viewed as a subset of the quaternions.

Cayley table 

The Cayley table (multiplication table) for Q8 is given by:

Properties 

The elements i, j, and k all have order four in Q8 and any two of them generate the entire group. Another presentation of Q8 based in only two elements to skip this redundancy is:

The quaternion group has the unusual property of being Hamiltonian: Q8 is non-abelian, but every subgroup is normal. Every Hamiltonian group contains a copy of Q8.

The quaternion group Q8 and the dihedral group D4 are the two smallest examples of a nilpotent non-abelian group.

The center and the commutator subgroup of Q8 is the subgroup . The inner automorphism group of Q8 is given by the group modulo its center, i.e. the factor group  which is isomorphic to the Klein four-group V. The full automorphism group of Q8 is isomorphic to S4, the symmetric group on four letters (see Matrix representations below), and the outer automorphism group of Q8 is thus S4/V, which is isomorphic to S3.

The quaternion group Q8 has five conjugacy classes,  and so five irreducible representations over the complex numbers, with dimensions 1, 1, 1, 1, 2:

Trivial representation.

Sign representations with i, j, k-kernel: Q8 has three maximal normal subgroups: the cyclic subgroups generated by i, j, and k respectively. For each maximal normal subgroup N, we obtain a one-dimensional representation factoring through the 2-element quotient group G/N. The representation sends elements of N to 1, and elements outside N to −1.

2-dimensional representation: Described below in Matrix representations.

The character table of Q8 turns out to be the same as that of D4: 

Since the irreducible characters  in the rows above have real values, this gives the decomposition of the real group algebra of  into minimal two-sided ideals: 

where the idempotents  correspond to the irreducibles: 

so that

Each of these irreducible ideals is isomorphic to a real central simple algebra, the first four to the real field . The last ideal  is isomorphic to the skew field of quaternions  by the correspondence:

Furthermore, the projection homomorphism  given by  has kernel ideal generated by the idempotent:

so the quaternions can also be obtained as the quotient ring .

The complex group algebra is thus  where  is the algebra of biquaternions.

Matrix representations 

The two-dimensional irreducible complex representation described above gives the quaternion group Q8 as a subgroup of the general linear group . The quaternion group is a multiplicative subgroup of the quaternion algebra: 

which has a regular representation  by left multiplication on itself considered as a complex vector space with basis  so that  corresponds to the -linear mapping  The resulting representation 

 

is given by:

Since all of the above matrices have unit determinant, this is a representation of Q8 in the special linear group .

A variant gives a representation by unitary matrices (table at right). Let  correspond to the linear mapping  so that  is given by:

It is worth noting that physicists exclusively use a different convention for the  matrix representation to make contact with the usual Pauli matrices:

This particular choice is convenient and elegant when one describes spin-1/2 states in the  basis and considers angular momentum ladder operators 

There is also an important action of Q8 on the 2-dimensional vector space over the finite field  (table at right). A modular representation  is given by

This representation can be obtained from the extension field:

where  and the multiplicative group  has four generators,  of order 8. For each  the two-dimensional -vector space  admits a linear mapping:

 

In addition we have the Frobenius automorphism  satisfying  and  Then the above representation matrices are: 

Thus, for each matrix , we have a group automorphism 

 

with  In fact, these give the full automorphism group as:  

This is isomorphic to the symmetric group S4 since the linear mappings  permute the four one-dimensional subspaces of  i.e., the four points of the projective space 

Also, this representation permutes the eight non-zero vectors of  giving an embedding of Q8 in the symmetric group S8, in addition to the embeddings given by the regular representations.

Galois group
As Richard Dean showed in 1981, the quaternion group can be presented as the Galois group Gal(T/Q) where Q is the field of rational numbers and T is the splitting field over Q of the polynomial
.
The development uses the fundamental theorem of Galois theory in specifying four intermediate fields between Q and T and their Galois groups, as well as two theorems on cyclic extension of degree four over a field.

Generalized quaternion group
A generalized quaternion group Q4n of order 4n is defined by the presentation

for an integer , with the usual quaternion group given by n = 2. Coxeter calls Q4n the dicyclic group , a special case of the binary polyhedral group  and related to the polyhedral group  and the dihedral group . The generalized quaternion group can be realized as the subgroup of  generated by

where .

The generalized quaternion groups have the property that every abelian subgroup is cyclic. It can be shown that a finite p-group with this property (every abelian subgroup is cyclic) is either cyclic or a generalized quaternion group as defined above. Another characterization is that a finite p-group in which there is a unique subgroup of order p is either cyclic or a 2-group isomorphic to generalized quaternion group. In particular, for a finite field F with odd characteristic, the 2-Sylow subgroup of SL2(F) is non-abelian and has only one subgroup of order 2, so this 2-Sylow subgroup must be a generalized quaternion group, .  Letting pr be the size of F, where p is prime, the size of the 2-Sylow subgroup of SL2(F) is 2n, where .

The Brauer–Suzuki theorem shows that the groups whose Sylow 2-subgroups are generalized quaternion cannot be simple.

Another terminology reserves the name "generalized quaternion group" for a dicyclic group of order a power of 2, which admits the presentation

==See also==
16-cell
Binary tetrahedral group
Clifford algebra
Dicyclic group
Hurwitz integral quaternion
List of small groups

Notes

References

 Dean, Richard A. (1981) "A rational polynomial whose group is the quaternions", American Mathematical Monthly 88:42–5.

 P.R. Girard (1984) "The quaternion group and modern physics", European Journal of Physics 5:25–32.

External links
 
 Quaternion groups on GroupNames
 Quaternion group on GroupProps
 Conrad, Keith. "Generalized Quaternions"

Group theory
Finite groups
Quaternions